Sebastian Schipper (born 8 May 1968) is a German actor and filmmaker.

Life and career
Sebastian Schipper studied acting at the Otto Falckenberg Schule in Munich from 1992 to 1995. He got his first film role in Sönke Wortmann's Little Sharks from 1992. He debuted as director with Absolute Giganten from 1999, which received the second place prize for the German Film Award for Best Fiction Film. It was co-produced by Tom Tykwer, who has cast Schipper in several of his own films. Schipper's 2009 film Sometime in August is loosely based on Johann Wolfgang von Goethe's novel Elective Affinities. His fourth film as director is Victoria, a film about a night in a Berlin nightclub gone awry, shot in one continuous take. It played at the 65th Berlin International Film Festival  and won in six categories at the German Film Award 2015, including Best Film and Best Direction.

Filmography
As actor
1992: Little Sharks (Kleine Haie) - Hamlet
1996: The English Patient - Interrogation Room Soldier #1
1997: Winter Sleepers (Winterschläfer) - Otto
1998: Eine ungehorsame Frau (TV Movie) - Niklas
1998: Run Lola Run (Lola rennt) - Mike
1998: Das merkwürdige Verhalten geschlechtsreifer Großstädter zur Paarungszeit - Andi
1999: Fremde Freundin - Matthias
2000: England! - Galerist
2000: The Princess and the Warrior (Der Krieger und die Kaiserin) - Security Typ 1
2002: Elefantenherz - Baerwald
2003: Ganz und gar - Physiotherapeut Frank
2004:  - Baste
2005: Die blaue Grenze - Biskup
2010: Three (Drei) - Simon
2012: Überleben an der Wickelfront (TV Movie) - Chefredakteur
2012: Ludwig II. - Ludwig II. im Alter
2013:  (TV Movie) - Chefredakteur
2013-2015: Tatort - Kommissar Jan Katz
2014: Inbetween Worlds - Constantin Lemarchal (uncredited)
2014: I Am Here - Peter
2015: Coconut Hero - Frank Burger

As director and writer
1999: Absolute Giganten
2006: A Friend of Mine (Ein Freund von mir)
2009: Sometime in August (Mitte Ende August)
2015: Victoria
2019: Roads

References

1968 births
20th-century German male actors
21st-century German male actors
German male film actors
German male television actors
Film people from Hanover
Living people
Actors from Hanover
Best Director German Film Award winners